Diocese of the South may refer to:

 Anglican Diocese of the South (part of the Anglican Church in North America)
 Orthodox Church in America Diocese of the South 
 Dioceses of continuing Anglican jurisdictions, including:
 Episcopal Missionary Church
 Anglican Catholic Church